The New British Poetry 1968-88 was a poetry anthology from 1988, jointly edited by Gillian Allnutt, Fred D'Aguiar, Ken Edwards and Eric Mottram, respectively concerned with feminist, Black British, younger experimental and British poetry revival poets. The book's general editor was John Muckle, founder of the Paladin Poetry Series. He attempted to challenge what many saw as a narrowly defined 'mainstream' by creating a book around different strands in radical poetry and four editors who might not otherwise have worked together: "Their differences, both in the shape they have given their selections and in their introductory remarks, make this a many-sided, exciting, unpredictable - and no doubt contentious book." The anthology's multicultural and counter-cultural stance gave it a strong anti-Thatcherite flavour. The book was widely if critically reviewed and went on to influence a number of subsequent anthologies of British poetry.

Poets in The New British Poetry

See also
 1988 in poetry
 1988 in literature
 20th century in literature
 20th century in poetry
 English literature
 List of poetry anthologies

See also
 New British Poetry (2004), edited by Don Paterson and Charles Simic, Graywolf Press, 2004

British Poetry Revival
Poetry anthologies
1988 books